Dubrowna District (also Dubroŭna District) is a district in Vitebsk Region, Belarus.

References

 
Districts of Vitebsk Region